Circulatory System is a psychedelic rock musical ensemble formed by musician/painter Will Cullen Hart, and featuring Derek Almstead, Suzanne Allison, Peter Erchick, John Fernandes, Charlie Johnston, and Heather McIntosh.

Hart, part of the Elephant Six Collective, was one of the lead players in The Olivia Tremor Control.  After that group disbanded in 2000, he and most of the other former Olivias, with the exception of Bill Doss (who was focusing on his solo project Sunshine Fix), and Eric Harris, formed Circulatory System.  Neutral Milk Hotel's Jeff Mangum also contributed to their albums, but was only briefly part of the touring version of the band.

Their third full-length album, Mosaics within Mosaics, was released on June 24, 2014.

Discography 
Circulatory System (2001, Cloud Recordings)
Inside Views (2001, Cloud Recordings)
Signal Morning (2009, Cloud Recordings)
Side 3 (2010, Cloud Recordings)
Mosaics Within Mosaics (2014, Cloud Recordings)

Compilation appearances
The band also released the track "Deserts (As Big as a Star)" on the benefit album The Amos House Collection Volume III on Wishing Tree Records.

References

External links
Cloud Recordings, the label founded by John Fernandes & Will Hart
W Cullen Hart interview at Sweet Pea

The Circulatory System @ Athens Popfest 2006, video recording

The Elephant 6 Recording Company artists
American psychedelic rock music groups
Musical groups from Georgia (U.S. state)
Neo-psychedelia groups